Sibidounda was a town of ancient Pisidia and later of Pamphylia inhabited during Roman and Byzantine times. 

Its site is located at Bozova (Zivint), in Asiatic Turkey.

References

Populated places in Pisidia
Populated places in ancient Pamphylia
Former populated places in Turkey
Populated places of the Byzantine Empire
Roman towns and cities in Turkey
History of Antalya Province
Korkuteli District